The 2003 FIA GT Donington 500 km was the fifth round the 2003 FIA GT Championship.  It took place at Donington Park, United Kingdom, on 29 June 2003.

Official results
Class winners in bold.  Cars failing to complete 70% of winner's distance marked as Not Classified (NC).

† – #18 Zwaan's Racing was disqualified for failing post-race technical inspection.  The car was found to have an illegal fuel cooling device in use.

Statistics
 Pole position – #4 Force One Racing Festina – 1:29.361
 Fastest lap – #2 Konrad Motorsport – 1:30.802
 Average speed – 149.950 km/h

References

 
 
 

D
FIA GT
June 2003 sports events in the United Kingdom